Thaalam Thettiya Tharattu is a 1983 Indian Malayalam-language legal drama film, directed by A. B. Raj and written by Cochin Haneefa. The film stars Menaka, Rajkumar, Lakshmi and Sankaradi. It is a remake of the Telugu film Nyayam Kavali.

Plot

Cast 
Menaka as Sindhu
Rajkumar as Ravikumar
Lakshmi as Adv.Rajalakshmi
Sankaradi as Velupilla
Cochin Haneefa as Chandran
Balan K. Nair as Adv.Rajashekharan
Master Suresh
Santhakumari
Sathyakala

Soundtrack 
The music was composed by Raveendran and the lyrics were written by R. K. Damodaran.

References

External links 
 

1980s legal drama films
1980s Malayalam-language films
1983 films
Films directed by A. B. Raj
Indian legal drama films
Indian pregnancy films
Malayalam remakes of Telugu films